Iolaus arborifera is a butterfly in the family Lycaenidae. It is found in the highlands of Kenya. The habitat consists of montane forests.

The larvae feed on Englerina woodfordioides and Loranthus freisiorum.

References

External links

Die Gross-Schmetterlinge der Erde 13: Die Afrikanischen Tagfalter. Plate XIII 69 a

Butterflies described in 1901
Iolaus (butterfly)
Endemic insects of Kenya
Butterflies of Africa